Agger may refer to:

 Agger (surname)
 Agger (ancient Rome), a type of ancient Roman rampart or embankment
 Agger (river), a river in North Rhine-Westphalia, Germany
 Agger nasi, an anatomical feature of the nose
 Agger Rockshelter, in Wisconsin, United States
 Agger Tange, a small peninsula in Jutland, Denmark
 Agger Valley Railway (disambiguation)
 Cranopsis agger, a species of sea snail